Brandon Alexander (born September 27, 1993) is a Canadian football defensive back for the Winnipeg Blue Bombers of the Canadian Football League (CFL).

Professional career
In his rookie season in 2017, Alexander was the team's nominee for the most outstanding rookie in the CFL. Alexander won the 107th Grey Cup with the Blue Bombers when they defeated the Hamilton Tiger-Cats 33-12. He had an interception early in that game when he grabbed Dane Evans' first pass of the game, this was one of seven turnovers created by Winnipeg.

Alexander signed a one-year contract extension with the Winnipeg Blue Bombers on January 11, 2021. Throughout the season, Alexander continued to build his reputation as a hard hitting safety for the Blue Bombers, with several bone crunching hits delivered to his opponents. While being named both a CFL West All-Star and CFL All-Star at safety for the first time, Alexander helped rebuild the Blue Bombers' secondary and recorded 36 tackles, two interceptions and one forced fumble as part of a defence that allowed a league-low 12.9 points per game. In his second CFL season, Alexander competed in his second championships when the team went to the 108th Grey Cup against the hometown Hamilton Tiger-Cats. The Bombers would trail for much of the second, third, and fourth quarters. Alexander would go on to contribute two tackles in a tough battle as the Bombers would go on to win their second consecutive Grey Cup in overtime by a score of 33-25.

Statistics

CFL

References

Living people
1993 births
American football defensive backs
Canadian football defensive backs
UCF Knights football players
African-American players of American football
African-American players of Canadian football
Winnipeg Blue Bombers players
21st-century African-American sportspeople